One-to-one or one to one  may refer to:

Mathematics and communication
One-to-one function, also called an injective function
One-to-one correspondence, also called a bijective function
One-to-one (communication), the act of an individual communicating with another
One-to-one (data model), a relationship in a data model
One to one computing (education), an initiative for a computer for every student
One-to-one marketing or personalized marketing, an attempt to make a unique product offering for each customer

Music
One to One (band), a 1980s Canadian pop music group
One to One (Carole King album), 1982
One to One (Christine Fan album), 2005
One to One (Howard Jones album), 1986
One to One (Syreeta album), 1977
One to One (Ed Bruce album), 1981
"One to One" (song), a song by British jazz-funk band Freeez

Other uses
One to One (Apple), Apple's personal training service
One 2 One, a defunct British mobile telecommunications company, which became T-Mobile UK
One to One (TV series), an Irish TV series

See also 
1-1 (disambiguation)
One-to-many (disambiguation)
Many-to-many
One on One (disambiguation)
One-way (disambiguation)